Atelolathys is a monotypic genus of Asian cribellate araneomorph spiders in the family Dictynidae containing the single species, Atelolathys varia. It was first described by Eugène Simon in 1892, and has only been found in Sri Lanka.

References

Dictynidae
Endemic fauna of Sri Lanka
Monotypic Araneomorphae genera
Spiders of Asia
Taxa named by Eugène Simon